The 2019–20 season was the 87th season of competitive football in Lebanon. Due to political and financial issues in the country, on 21 January 2020, the LFA decided to suspend all football leagues until further notice, and cancelled the three match days that were previously played (the last one being on 17 October 2019). With the COVID-19 pandemic also stopping sporting activities globally, the season was officially cancelled on 28 May 2020.

National teams

Lebanon national football team

Kits

Results and fixtures

Friendlies

2019 WAFF Championship

Group A

2022 FIFA World Cup qualification

Second round: Group H

AFC competitions

AFC Cup

Group stage

Group A

Group B

Men's football

Lebanese Premier League

Lebanese Second Division

Cup competitions

Lebanese FA Cup

Lebanese Super Cup

Lebanese Elite Cup

Final

Lebanese Challenge Cup

Final

Women's football

Lebanese Women's Football League

Cup competitions

Lebanese Women's FA Cup

Lebanese Women's Super Cup

Notes

References

External links 
 RSSSF

 
Seasons in Lebanese football
2019 in Lebanese sport
2020 in Lebanese sport
Lebanon
Lebanon
2019 sport-related lists
2020 sport-related lists